The Texas League Hall of Fame is an American baseball hall of fame which honors players, managers, and executives of the Double-A Texas League of Minor League Baseball for their accomplishments or contributions to the league in playing, administrative, or other roles. The Hall of Fame inducted its first class in 2004. As of 2016, 138 individuals have been inducted into the Texas League Hall of Fame.

Table key

Inductees

References
General

Specific

External links
Official website

Hall
Minor league baseball museums and halls of fame
Minor league baseball trophies and awards
Halls of fame in Texas
Awards established in 2004
2004 establishments in Texas